Buffy Ford Stewart is an American singer, guitarist, and songwriter. She is best known for her solo work, and her work with John Stewart.

Biography

Buffy Ford and John Stewart
Buffy and John met in 1967 when John left the Kingston Trio and sought a female singing partner. After George Yanuk told John about Buffy, John saw her perform in a musical comedy show at the Festival Theatre in San Anselmo, California. He then offered her the job. Jefferson Airplane was also interested in her as a vocalist, but she chose to work with John.

John and Buffy were a part of Robert F. Kennedy's 1968 presidential campaign. At each stop, they would sing songs before Kennedy gave a talk.

In 1968, Buffy and John recorded the album Signals Through the Glass. This album included the song "July You're a Woman," which John also recorded for his 1969 album California Bloodlines.

John and Buffy married in 1975.  John considered Buffy to be his muse and inspiration for many of his songs. He called her "Angel Rain".

Together, John and Buffy recorded and released Live at the Turf Inn, Scotland in 1996, with four of Buffy's solo performances. It was initially released as The Essential John and Buffy.

They also recorded John Stewart & Darwin's Army in 1999 with Dave Crossland and John Hoke, an album of acoustic traditional music with drum accompaniment.

Solo career
Buffy's 2012 album Same Old Heart, produced by Craig Caffall, featured the final vocal performance by the late Davy Jones on John Stewart's song "Daydream Believer" which had been originally recorded by The Monkees. Other guests included Peter Tork, Rosanne Cash, Maura Kennedy, Kris Kristofferson, Eliza Gilkyson, Timothy B Schmit, Dan Hicks, and Nanci Griffith. Henry Diltz shot the album cover photographs.

Her 2015 EP Angel Rain was co-produced by Buffy and Ari Rios, and contains four original songs as well as her version of John's song "Little Road and a Stone to Roll."

Other projects
Buffy has recently finished writing a children’s book: The Blanket and the Bear.

Buffy is also working on a documentary about John's life, titled The Ghost of Daydream Believer: John Stewart's American Spirit.

Personal life
Buffy has battled cancer and brain tumors, and experienced hip and knee replacements over the years.

John Stewart died in San Diego in 2008.  John and Buffy had one son Luke, and three children from a previous marriage: Jeremy, Amy, and Mikael  (a sound technician).

Discography

Solo albums
 2013: Same Old Heart (CD Baby)
 2013: Buffy's Christmas Album (Global Recording Artists)
 2015: Angel Rain EP (Global Recording Artists)
 2017: Once Upon a Time (CD Baby)

Buffy Ford and Nirmala Kate Heriza
 2004: Hearts Together (Neon Dreams)

With John Stewart
 1968: Signals Through The Glass (Capitol) as John Stewart and Buffy Ford 
 1970: Willard (Capitol)
 1971: The Lonesome Picker Rides Again (Warner Bros.)
 1972: Sunstorm (Warner Bros.)
 1973: Cannons in the Rain (RCA Victor)
 1974: The Phoenix Concerts (RCA Victor) - reissued in different configuration in 1980 as John Stewart in Concert and in 1990 by Bear Family as The Complete Phoenix Concerts
 1977: Fire In The Wind (RSO)
 1979: Bombs Away Dream Babies (RSO)
 1987: Punch the Big Guy (Cypress)
 1984: Trancas (Affordable Dreams)
 1992: Bullets in the Hour Glass (Shanachie)
 1995: Airdream Believer (Shanachie)
 1996: Live At The Turf Inn, Scotland (Folk Era) John Stewart and Buffy Ford - originally issued in 1994 as The Essential John & Buffy
 1996: An American Folk Song Anthology (Laserlight)
 1996: American Journey (Laserlight)
 1997: Rough Sketches (Folk Era)
 2002: The Last Campaign (Laserlight)
 2003: Havana (Appleseed)
 2006: The Day the River Sang (Appleseed)

Also appeared on
 1974: John Denver - Back Home Again (RCA Victor)

References

External links 
 
 
 
 

Living people
Year of birth missing (living people)
Place of birth missing (living people)
20th-century American musicians
American women singer-songwriters
20th-century American women singers
20th-century American singers
21st-century American women